On August 31, 2019, a spree shooting occurred in the West Texas cities of Midland and Odessa, involving a gunman shooting multiple people from a vehicle. Eight people were killed, including the perpetrator, and twenty-five people were injured, including three police officers. It was the third major mass shooting to take place in the United States in August 2019, following the El Paso Walmart shooting and the Dayton shooting (both of which took place on August 3, 2019).

Authorities identified the shooter as 36-year-old Seth Aaron Ator from Lorena, Texas, a man who had been fired from his job the morning of the shooting spree. He was later shot and killed by police outside a movie theater in Odessa.

Shootings 
The shooting spree began at 3:17 p.m. during a traffic stop on Interstate 20, where a Texas state trooper was shot while attempting to stop a gold 1999 Toyota Camry over a failure to signal a left turn. The suspect continued into Odessa, Texas, and shot another person on the Interstate.  In Odessa, he abandoned the Toyota, hijacked a United States Postal Service-labeled Dodge Caravan, killed a 29-year-old letter carrier and continued to drive and shoot people before police cornered and killed him in the parking lot of a Cinergy movie theater.

There was initial confusion over where the perpetrator was and how many individuals were involved. The confusion is apparent over the police scanner where one officer states about twenty minutes after the first officer was shot; "We're getting multiple calls for different victims in different locations. I've got people talking on four different channels, I'm not clear on anything, you're all talking."

Victims 
Seven people, ranging in age from 15 to 57, were killed. Seventeen more were hospitalized for injuries. Among the injured were three police: a Texas state trooper, a Midland police officer, and an Odessa police officer. The youngest victim was a wounded 17-month-old child. One of the dead was a USPS postal worker, age 29, who had been driving the postal service truck Ator hijacked.

Perpetrator 
The day after the shooting, police identified the shooter as 36-year-old Seth Aaron Ator of Lorena, Texas. Officials initially refused to identify Ator as they did not want to give him any notoriety. He grew up in Lorena, and attended McLennan Community College in Waco, Texas. He was arrested in Waco in 2001 for trespassing and evading arrest for trying to break into a woman's bedroom after threatening to kill her brother, which he pleaded guilty to in 2002.

Ator lived in West Odessa in Ector County in "a metal shack that lacked electricity, plumbing, a floor and even furniture"; he lived alone, except for a small dog. A neighbor said that, well before his killing spree, he had yelled at her while carrying a large rifle. She also said he sometimes shot animals from his roof, which she had complained to police about, but they never responded to her complaint. Another neighbor told the Associated Press that her family had lived near Ator for the past five months and were afraid of him due to his tendency to shoot rabbits in the nighttime and him banging on their door early one morning.

In January 2014, Ator failed a national criminal background check when he tried to purchase a gun; the system flagged him as ineligible because of a prior local court determination that he was mentally unfit. According to law enforcement officials, Ator subsequently bought the gun used in the shooting via a private sale, without having to go through a background check.

Investigation 
On September 1, the FBI said it was executing a search warrant at the suspect's house, located about 20 minutes west of Odessa. On September 2, at a press conference, FBI agent Christopher Combs said that the perpetrator turned up for work "enraged". Ator was fired from his job at Journey Oilfield Services hours before the shooting. Fifteen minutes before his encounter with troopers, Ator phoned a national tip line. Agent Combs described the call as "rambling statements about some of the atrocities that he felt that he had gone through", adding "He did not make a threat during that phone call". FBI agents attempted to identify and locate the caller, but were unable to do so in the fifteen minutes before the shooting began.
Police said Ator used an AR-15 type rifle in the shooting, but did not say where he obtained it.

On September 4, The Wall Street Journal and news station KCBD reported that the FBI and law enforcement in Lubbock served a search warrant to a person of interest, suspected of illegally manufacturing and selling the rifle in connection with the shooting.

Investigation showed that the rifle used in the shooting was purchased on October 8, 2016 from Marcus Anthony Braziel, 45, of Lubbock, Texas. Braziel plead guilty in October 2020 to one count of dealing firearms without a license and one count of subscribing to a false tax return related to his firearm dealing. He was sentenced to 24 months in federal prison. In a four-year span, Mr. Braziel inadvertently sold firearms to four prohibited persons: a convicted felon, a man under felony indictment, an immigrant in the U.S. illegally, and Mr. Ator, a man who the courts previously deemed unfit to possess a firearm.

Aftermath 
The University of Texas of the Permian Basin was placed on lockdown due to its proximity to the shooting.

Multiple politicians issued statements about the shooting, including President Donald Trump, Texas Senator Ted Cruz, Texas Representative Mike Conaway, Texas Governor Greg Abbott, and Texas Attorney General Ken Paxton. Democrats generally urged more gun restriction laws, while Republicans offered thoughts and prayers, called for cultural changes, and pointed out mental illness issues.

Texas State Representative Matt Schaefer, a Republican from Tyler, rejected calls for tighter gun restrictions, which he described as violating "God-given" gun rights; instead, Schaefer advocated a "YES to God" and a "YES to praying for protection". Schaefer's comments received national attention.

On September 4, Democrats in the Texas House held five press conferences in Houston, Dallas, San Antonio, Austin, and El Paso. Sixty-one members of the House Democratic Caucus signed a letter delivered to Governor Abbott asking him to call an emergency special session "on protecting Texans from gun violence," urging him to address the gun violence epidemic. In a statement, Abbott spokesman John Wittman said "Governor Abbott made clear in Odessa that all strategies are on the table that will lead to laws that make Texans safer. But that doesn’t include a helter-skelter approach that hastily calls for perfunctory votes that divide legislators along party lines. Instead, the Governor seeks consensus rather than division, The Democrats who are part of today’s partisan pitch can be part of the bi-partisan legislative process announced yesterday that is geared toward achieving real solutions, or they can be part of politics as usual that will accomplish nothing. Legislating on tough issues is hard and takes time. If Democrats really want to change the law, they need to stop talking to cameras and start talking to colleagues in the Capitol to reach consensus." In response, Donna Howard of the Texas House of Representatives, at a press conference in Austin said: "You know who can build a consensus is the Governor. If the Governor speaks up and says he will get behind certain legislation, we will have a consensus..."

Also on September 4, during a visit with Midland and Odessa city and law enforcement leaders to talk about ways to prevent mass shootings, Cruz spoke with a local news station saying: "Much of my discussions with law enforcer [sic] today was what were the warning signs that we had that this individual had a serious mental illness that posed a danger to himself or to others... What could we have done better to stop this deranged criminal from getting a gun in the first place? And that’s going to be an ongoing discussion."

On September 5, Abbott issued eight executive orders in response to the El Paso and Odessa-Midland mass shootings, in a statement Abbott said: “Texas must achieve several objectives to better protect our communities and our residents from mass shootings, I will continue to work expeditiously with the legislature on laws to keep guns out of the hands of dangerous criminals, while safeguarding the 2nd Amendment rights of law-abiding Texans.”

Marcus Anthony Braziel, 45, of Lubbock, was sentenced to two years in prison in January 2021 for illegally selling the AR-15 style rifle that Seth Aaron Ator used in the shooting.

A memorial plaza, called the Bright Star Memorial Plaza, has been planned to be built on the University of Texas Permian Basin campus.

See also 

List of shootings in Texas
1969 Pennsylvania Turnpike shootings

References

External links 
 Midland Reporter-Telegram list of deceased and injured

2019 active shooter incidents in the United States
2019 crimes in Texas
2019 murders in the United States
August 2019 crimes in the United States
Deaths by firearm in Texas
Midland–Odessa
Midland, Texas
Odessa, Texas
Spree shootings in the United States